Bolo may refer to:

Arts, entertainment, and media

Fictional entities
 Bolo, a fictional tribe in bolo'bolo by P.M.
 Bolo, a character in the  Shantae series
 Bolo universe, a science fiction universe created by Keith Laumer
 Prince Bolo, a character in Haroun and the Sea of Stories

Video games
 Bolo (1982 video game), an Apple II tank game
 Bolo (1987 video game), a simulation of a tank battle
 Bolo (Breakout clone), an enhanced clone of the Breakout computer game for the Atari ST

Military and weapons
 Bolo Airfield, a World War II airfield on Okinawa
 Bolo knife, a Filipino knife similar to the machete
 Bolo Shell, a type of specialty shotgun shell
 Douglas B-18 Bolo, a United States Army Air Corps bomber aircraft from the 1930s
 Operation Bolo, a United States military operation during the Vietnam War
 Bolo, a variant of the Mauser C96 semi-automatic pistol

People
 Bolo (footballer) (born 1974), Spanish footballer
 Bolo (prince) (1613–1652), Manchu prince of the Qing Dynasty
 Bolo Pasha (born Paul Bolo, 1867–1918), French adventurer and German agent of the First World War
 Lashmer Whistler or Bolo (1898–1963), British general of the Second World War
 Bolo Yeung (born 1946), Chinese actor and martial artist

Places
 Bolo, Central African Republic
 Bolo, Ethiopia, a village in Ethiopia
 Bolo River, a river in Romania
 Bolo, Tibet, a township in Tibet
 Bolo Township, Washington County, Illinois, US
 Ogu/Bolo, a Local Government Area of Nigeria
 BOLO, Bos & Lommer, a neighbourhood of Amsterdam in the Netherlands

Other uses
 BOLO or all-points bulletin, in law enforcement
 Bolo (bread), commonly prepared by Tunisian, Libyan, and Italian Jews
 Bolo (tether), a type of spinning space tether
 Bolo bat, a child's toy
 Bolo punch, a wide sweeping lower cut used in martial arts
 Bolo snake or Fiji snake (Ogmodon vitianus), an extremely rare snake found only in Fiji
 Bolo tie, a decorative string tie
 Bolo, a derogatory term for Bolshevik
  Bolo, a cake in Portuguese cuisine
Bolo language, a Bantu language of Angola

See also
 Bola (disambiguation)
 Bolas, a throwing rope with weights at both ends to entangle prey
 Bollo (disambiguation)
 O Bolo, a municipality in Galicia, Spain